Saints Sapor, Isaac, Mahanes, Abraham, and Simeon (died 339 AD) were a group of Christians in Persia who were martyred under King Shapur II.
Their feast day is 30 November.

Monks of Ramsgate account

The monks of St Augustine's Abbey, Ramsgate wrote in their Book of Saints (1921),

Butler's account

The hagiographer Alban Butler (1710–1773) wrote in his Lives of the Fathers, Martyrs, and Other Principal Saints under November 30,

See also
 Martyrs of Persia under Shapur II

Notes

Sources

 
 

Year of birth missing
339 deaths
Groups of Christian martyrs of the Roman era
Persian saints
4th-century Christian saints
Christians in the Sasanian Empire